Porsuk (literally "badger" in Turkish) may refer to the following places in Turkey:

 Porsuk River
 Porsuk Dam, on the river
 Porsuk, Çarşamba, a village in the district of Çarşamba, Samsun Province
 Porsuk, Pasinler, a village in the district of Pasinler, Erzurum Province
 Porsuk, Sivas, a village in the central (Sivas) district of Sivas Province
 Porsuk, Ulukışla, a village in Ulukışla district Niğde Province